Yes, Madam? is a 1938 British musical comedy film directed by Norman Lee and starring Bobby Howes, Diana Churchill and Wylie Watson.

Background
The film was adapted from a play by K.R.G. Browne, itself based on a novel by the same author. The film was shot at Elstree Studios, with sets designed by the art director Cedric Dawe.

Plot
Two cousins, Billy Quinton and Sally Gaunt, have to spend a month in service to qualify for an inheritance from an eccentric uncle. They find themselves in the same household, as valet/chauffeur and as maid, where they are tracked down by their arch-enemy Tony Tolliver, who will get the money should either of the cousins fail in their task by getting the sack. Tony therefore tries various schemes to get them sacked – succeeding, but still failing to get the legacy.

Cast
 Bobby Howes as Bill Quinton
 Diana Churchill as Sally Gault
 Wylie Watson as Albert Peabody, a retired button manufacturer
 Bertha Belmore as Emily Peabody, his unmarried sister
 Vera Pearce as Pansy Beresford, an actress
 Billy Milton as Tony Tolliver
 Fred Emney as Sir Charles Drake-Drake
 Cameron Hall as Catlett, former burglar, now manservant to Tolliver
 Geoffrey Sumner as Scoffin
 Arthur Hambling as a police constable

Music and dance sequences
Set pieces taken from the stage production included a scene with a 'sloshed Emney', Czecho-Slovakian Love - "Here beneath the white lights gleaming above" (Pansy and Bill) and 'Yes, Madam' -  "I'm in love, I confess" (Bill and Sally).

References

Bibliography
 Wood, Linda. British Films, 1927-1939. British Film Institute, 1986.

External links

1938 films
British musical comedy films
1938 musical comedy films
Films shot at Associated British Studios
1930s English-language films
Films directed by Norman Lee
British black-and-white films
1930s British films